Tom Gough (born February 20, 1972) was an Olympic weightlifter for the United States.  His coaches were Steve Gough and Dragomir Cioroslan.

Weightlifting achievements
Olympic Games team member (1996 & 2000)
Bronze Medalist at Pan American Games (1995)
Senior National Champion (1995-1998, 2000)
Three-time Junior World Team Member
Twice Junior National Champion
All-Time Senior American record holder in total
Senior American record holder in snatch, clean and jerk, and total (1993-1997)

External links
Tom Gough - Hall of Fame at Weightlifting Exchange

1972 births
Living people
American male weightlifters
Olympic weightlifters of the United States
Weightlifters at the 1996 Summer Olympics
Weightlifters at the 2000 Summer Olympics
Pan American Games medalists in weightlifting
Pan American Games bronze medalists for the United States
Weightlifters at the 1995 Pan American Games
20th-century American people
21st-century American people